Anarchias cantonensis is a moray eel commonly known as the Canton Island moray or the Canton moray. It was first named by Schultz in 1943 and is found in coral reefs in the Pacific and Indian Oceans.

References

cantonensis
Fish of the Indian Ocean
Fish of the Pacific Ocean
Fish described in 1943